Turbo imperialis is a species of sea snail, a marine gastropod mollusk in the family Turbinidae, the turban snails.

T. imperialis is fished commercially for its pearly shell, and is often confused with T. marmoratus; both species are known as "the green snail". This species is also often confused with Turbo militaris.

Description
The length of the shell varies between 50 mm and 120 mm. The large, solid shell has a globose-conic shape. It is ventricose and imperforate. Its color is green, irregularly mottled and spirally striped with chestnut, closely irregularly striate with the same color. The 6-7 convex whorls show well marked sutures, and numerous more or less conspicuous revolving furrows. The large body whorl is somewhat flattened above. The aperture is subcircular and pearly white within The outer lip is rather thin. The arched columella has a pearly callus, which reappears at the posterior angle. The green parietal wall is nearly devoid of callus. The base of the shell is slightly dilated and scarcely produced.

Distribution
According to the Natural History Museum, this marine species occurs off East Africa, Madagascar, Mauritius and Reunion.

References

 Dautzenberg, Ph. (1929). Contribution à l'étude de la faune de Madagascar: Mollusca marina testacea. Faune des colonies françaises, III(fasc. 4). Société d'Editions géographiques, maritimes et coloniales: Paris. 321–636, plates IV-VII pp. 
 Alf A. & Kreipl K. (2003). A Conchological Iconography: The Family Turbinidae, Subfamily Turbininae, Genus Turbo. Conchbooks, Hackenheim Germany.

External links
 

imperialis
Gastropods described in 1790
Taxa named by Johann Friedrich Gmelin